Orthogonis is a genus of robber flies (insects in the family Asilidae). There are about 14 described species in Orthogonis.

Species
These 14 species belong to the genus Orthogonis:

 Orthogonis andamanensis Joseph & Parui, 1981 c g
 Orthogonis campbelli (Paramonov, 1958) c g
 Orthogonis clavata (White, 1914) c g
 Orthogonis erythropus (Wulp, 1898) c g
 Orthogonis liturifera (Walker, 1861) c g
 Orthogonis madagascarensis Bromley, 1942 c g
 Orthogonis mauroides (Paramonov, 1958) c g
 Orthogonis nigrocaerulea (Wulp, 1872) c g
 Orthogonis nitididorsalis Tagawa, 2006 c g
 Orthogonis obliquistriga (Walker, 1861) c g
 Orthogonis ornatipennis (Macquart, 1850) c g
 Orthogonis scapularis (Wiedemann, 1828) c g
 Orthogonis stygia (Bromley, 1931) i c g b
 Orthogonis zentae (Paramonov, 1958) c g

Data sources: i = ITIS, c = Catalogue of Life, g = GBIF, b = Bugguide.net

References

Further reading

External links

 

Laphriinae
Asilidae genera
Articles created by Qbugbot